Mákina is an electronic music genre which originated in Spain.

Makina may also refer to:
 Dar al-Makina, often referred to as the Makina, a Moroccan 19th-century arms factory
 Plaubel Makina, a series of medium format press cameras
 El Makina, a 2012 album by Jordanian rock band JadaL
 La Makina, a Honduran merengue band

People with the name
 Makina Kameya (died 1988), Zimbabwean sculptor
 Anastasiia Makina (born 1997), Russian handballer
 Precious Makina (born 1985), Zambian boxer